Watergate House is in Watergate Street, Chester, Cheshire, England.  It is recorded in the National Heritage List for England as a designated Grade II* listed building.

History

Watergate House was built in 1820 as a town house for Henry Potts, Clerk of the Peace for the County of Cheshire.  It was designed by Thomas Harrison.  In 1907 it became the headquarters of Western Command. After the command moved to the new Command Headquarters in Queen's Park Road in 1938, Watergate House then became the headquarters of the Cheshire Community Council, and has since been used as offices.

Architecture

The house is constructed in Flemish bond brown brick with stone dressings and a grey slate roof.  It has two storeys plus a basement.  The plan of the main block is square, with the entrance in a recessed convex quadrant at the northeast corner.  A service wing projects to the south.  Six curved steps lead up to a curved eight-panel door with four-pane sidelights and a three-pane overlight.  The door is surrounded by an Ionic doorcase. Above this, in the upper storey, is a twelve-pane sash window in an architrave, the bottom panel of which is inscribed with aa crown flanked by initials "E" and "R".  Both storeys on the east and north sides contain three twelve-pane sash windows.  On the west (garden) front is a central two-storey bay window containing sash windows, flanked by sash windows in each storey.  The entrance door leads through a domed circular lobby to an octagonal central hall.

See also

Grade II* listed buildings in Cheshire West and Chester
List of works by Thomas Harrison

References

Further reading

Grade II* listed buildings in Chester
Grade II* listed houses
Watergate House
Neoclassical architecture in Cheshire
Thomas Harrison buildings